Oleg Reidman (born 21 May 1952) is a Moldovan politician, currently serving in the Parliament of the Republic of Moldova.

Biography 
He is one of the leaders of the Party of Communists of the Republic of Moldova. He is a close acquaintance of the ex-Moldovan President, Vladimir Voronin.

Personal life 
Reidman is of Russian-Jewish descent.

References

Living people
Members of the parliament of Moldova
Moldovan communists
Communist Party of Moldavia politicians
Communist Party of the Soviet Union members
Party of Communists of the Republic of Moldova politicians
1952 births
Moldovan people of Russian descent
Moldovan Jews
Bessarabian Jews
Jewish Moldovan politicians
Jewish communists
Moldovan physicists
Jewish physicists
Soviet physicists
Voronezh State University alumni
Politicians from Chișinău
Soviet military engineers